To the Max is a 1991 American heavy metal band the Mentors fourth album, and final studio album with original lead singer El Duce.

Track listing
"When You're Horny, You're Horny" - 2:41
"God's Gift to Women"- 2:57
"Donkey Dick" - 3:18
"Forty Ouncer"	- 2:52
"Menage Aw Twa" - 5:08
"All Women Are Insane" - 2:36
"Midnite Mistress" - 3:14
"Sex Slave" - 4:20
"Sewage Worker" - 2:58	
"Mother/Daughter Team"	- 2:53
"Group Rate" - 3:45
"Leave Some for Vultures" - 2:32

Personnel
 El Duce — drums, lead vocals
 Sickie Wifebeater — guitar
 Dr. Heathen Scum — bass

References

1991 albums
Mentors (band) albums